Elinga-Mpango or Elingampango is a community in the Sankuru province of the Democratic Republic of the Congo.

Location

Elinga-Mpango is in the Lomela Territory of Sankuru. 
It is on the right bank of the Tshuapa River.
From  Bondo to Elinga-Mpango the river narrows and winds, and is not navigable all year round.
The Tshuapa has cataracts above Elingampango, preventing further navigation.

The village is the Roman Catholic Diocese of Kole, and has a church dedicated to the Cœur Immaculé de Marie.
The church was erected in 1956.
It also has a health enter and dispensary.

Notes

Sources

Populated places in Sankuru